T.I.A.P.F.Y.H. (stylized in all lowercase) is the debut studio album by American singer-songwriter and producer Left at London. Produced as part of an artist in residency program with City of Shoreline Public Art Program, the album was digitally self-released by the artist on June 4, 2021, with vinyl and cassettes released by Fourth Strike Records in May 2022. The album's title is an acronym for its two title tracks, "There is a Place for You Here" and "This is a Protest for Your Heart!!!" The album's title was announced on March 26, 2021 as t.i.a.p.f.y.h.

Release
On March 26, 2021, Nat Puff announced that she would be working on her debut studio album, T.I.A.P.F.Y.H., as part of an artist in residency program with an at the time unannounced group. She clarified that You Are Not Alone Enough, the album previously announced as her debut, was pushed back. Puff had another record planned, "a Sufjan Stevens–type project, a concept album about Seattle and King County and Washington state". One song from this project, "The Ballad of Marion Zioncheck" was included on T.I.A.P.F.Y.H.

Composition
T.I.A.P.F.Y.H. is an indie pop,  lo-fi, and indie folk album that takes influence from an eclectic array of styles including folk, hyperpop, hip-hop, disco, and electronic music.

Critical reception
Michael Rietmulder of The Seattle Times praised the song "Pills & Good Advice", calling it "a masterfully ambitious suite, and loaded with twists and turns" and praised Puff's "era-spanning attention to songcraft and deftness working with a broad and contemporary sonic palette."

Track listing
All songs produced by Nat Puff, except track 7, which is produced by Puff and Phixel

Notes
Track 3 stylized in all lowercase
Track 7 stylized in all caps

Personnel

Musicians

Left at London – vocals, all other instruments
Chromonicci – additional vocals 
Kaiya Crawford – additional vocals 
Sophia Konat – additional vocals 
Laura Les – additional guitar 
Lunamatic – additional drums , additional guitar 
Vera Much – piano , additional drums 
Robert Puff – saxophone 
Rohan Ramdin – additional vocals , additional drums 
Nick Villa – drums , additional drums

Technical
Peter Kuli – mastering , mixing engineer 
Chuck Sutton – mastering 
Lilian Davis – mastering 
Ashley Ninelives – mixing engineer

References

Left at London albums
2021 debut albums
Self-released albums